USS Phenakite (PYc-25) was a converted yacht that was used by the United States Navy during World War I and World War II. The vessel was also known as Celt, Sachem (SP-192), Sightseer and Circle Line V.

History
USS Phenakite (PYc-25) was built 1902 as the yacht Celt by Pusey and Jones, Wilmington, Delaware, for J. Rogers Maxwell, a railroad executive. It was launched on April 12, 1902.

Shortly after the United States' entry into the First World War, it was acquired by the US Navy on July 3, 1917. The ship was placed in service as USS Sachem (SP 192) on August 19 and used as a Coastal Patrol Yacht. During its Navy service, it was loaned to inventor Thomas Edison who conducted government-funded experiments with it to develop countermeasures to U-boats.

After the end of World War I, Sachem was returned to her owner, Manton B. Metcalf of New York, on February 10, 1919. It was later sold to Philadelphia banker Roland L. Taylor and then to Jacob "Jake" Martin of Brooklyn, New York in 1932 who converted it to a fishing excursion boat.

The yacht was reacquired by the Navy on February 17, 1942 for $65,000 and converted for naval service at Robert Jacobs Inc., City Island, New York. It was commissioned as USS Phenakite (PYc-25) on July 1 at Tompkinsville, New York and patrolled the waters off of the Florida Keys during World War II. It was decommissioned to undergo modifications and placed back in service on November 17, 1944. It was used for testing sonar systems before being placed out of service on October 2, 1945 at Tompkinsville, and transferred to the Maritime Commission for disposal on November 5.

The vessel was then returned to her previous owner, Martin, and renamed Sachem on December 29. It was struck from the Naval Register February 7, 1946. It was subsequently resold to the Circle Line of New York City and renamed Sightseer, but was later renamed Circle Line V. It served as a tour boat until 1983.

In 1986, a Cincinnati local named Robert Miller purchased the ship for the low price of $7,500 and spent 10 days restoring the yacht so it could make the journey to the Midwest. After using the boat to take friends out on New York Harbor for the ceremonial relighting of the Statue of Liberty during the July 4 weekend, Miller took the boat back home via the Hudson River, the Great Lakes, the Mississippi River, and the Ohio River before settling at the mouth of Taylor Creek near its confluence with the Ohio River on Miller's property in Boone County, Kentucky.

Unable to afford expensive repairs needed to save it, Miller left the boat to rust away on Taylor Creek where it remains to this day. The decayed and abandoned boat is a popular destination for kayak enthusiasts in the Cincinnati area and is commonly referred to as "The Ghost Ship."

Robert Miller died in 2016.

Pop culture 
Before leaving New York Harbor, the boat was used in Madonna's 'Papa Don't Preach' music video in 1986. While  the boat was being worked on one day, a limousine pulled up to the dock and a representative for Madonna asked if they could use the ship in an upcoming music video. Miller agreed and the boat can briefly be seen in the video.

Awards
For her service in the U.S. Navy, Sachem / Phenakite earned the following awards:
World War I Victory Medal
American Campaign Medal
World War II Victory Medal

References

External links
"Ghost Ship" at Queen City Discovery
The Sachem Project, a restoration project
Thomas A. Edison: Unorthodox Submarine Hunter

1902 ships
Ships built by Pusey and Jones
Patrol vessels of the United States Navy
Shipwrecks of the Ohio River
World War II patrol vessels of the United States